Suman Maruti Muthe (born c. 1947) is a social worker, women's activist and writer based in Nashik, Maharashtra in India who has been actively working in the areas of child welfare and women development, particularly in the tribal belts of Maharashtra, for more than 35 years. She has initiated and implemented several projects and guided women on various aspects such as child health care, women's rights and family counselling. In recognition of her work, she has been awarded by more than 50 organisations which include the State level award by Government of Maharashtra, India, "Ahilyadevi Holkar Puraskar" given for outstanding contribution to the society in the areas of women and child development. She has also authored many books on women, tribals, sociological topics and has published and presented them at Indian and International events. Suman Muthe is married to Maruti Muthe, retired Divisional Forest Officer and has a daughter Captain Rashmi Muthe and son, Pankaj Muthe

Career
Muthe started her career as a lecturer teaching Sociology and Marathi. Thereafter, she completed her M.Phil. and has written many articles and a book on tribal women highlighting the patterns and issues of tribal working women, how they have evolved over the years and coming from backward areas, how they have coped up with various challenges in urban areas. Her writings are based on the actual work she has been carrying out and as a result she was able to better understand the issues of tribal women and measures to be adopted to resolve them. Her well-known books include Sociology-Introduction and Concept, Life of Indian Women in the changing sociological system, Life of Indian Tribal Women, Role of women during the cooperative movement of Maharashtra. All these books are written in the Marathi language.
She has also written short poems, called "charolya" in Marathi which can be found on her blog: https://sumanmuthe.blogspot.com/

Literary contributions to universities
 Jawaharlal Nehru University
 Mumbai Vishvavidyalaya 
 Osmania University
 Rajasthan University
 Rani Durgavati University
 Shivaji University
 North Maharashtra University
 Tilak Maharashtra University
 Dr Babasaheb Ambedkar University

Contributions in media and publications
 Deshdoot
 Gavkari
 Lokmat 
 Maharashtra Times
 Diwali Ank
 Research papers
 Journals

Institutional engagements
Joint Secretary: Satyaniketan Sanstha (established 1950) 
President: Stree Aadhar Kendra
Life member: Nashik Journalists Association, Kusumagraj Pratishthan, Rashtriya Samajshastra Parishad

Social Work
She has been doing voluntary work with Satyaniketan Trust in a small town called Rajur in Ahmednagar district of Maharashtra. Although this trust has been functioning since more than 50 years in tribal areas, there are so many issues that are still unresolved. Satyaniketan Trust was founded by Gandhians and a majority of their work has been in the field of education through ashram schools, regular schools and colleges. Suman Muthe's work in this trust has been focussed on women and child development. Some of the common issues that are faced in these areas include lack of basic education, health and malnutrition, marital issues, lack of education on women rights, sanitation and environment protection.

Muthe has undertaken various projects and camps with the help of volunteers in this trust and has successfully implemented projects concerning the above-mentioned issues. The issue of wrongful exploitation of women in these areas has reduced considerably due to the efforts taken by Suman Muthe. She visits these villages, holding meetings with members of the trust and contribute as much as possible.

Awards
Suman Muthe is the recipient of more than 50 awards from different institutions and organizations from India and Internationally. She has been conferred the Ahilyadevi Holkar Award by the Government of Maharashtra in the past, has also been honoured with Siddha Sewa award by Swami Hardas Foundation in Pune. The foundation has been actively working in India since 1990 and has an active presence in many other countries. The award has been constituted to felicitate those who have shown exemplary contributions to the society. The "Siddha Sewa" award by Swami Hardas Foundation, Pune is her 22nd award in her list of recognitions. In the past she has been honoured with Amrutratna award for the work done for tribal women, Patrashri award for outstanding literary contributions, Patramaharshi award by Journalists Association, National Integration Fellowship award etc. Her participation in various rural projects for conservation of water, tribal women education, childcare education is well known. Besides doing grassroots work, she has written books, poems, delivers lectures and is a prolific writer in Marathi print media.

Conferences
Active participation and presentation in Sociological and Marathi Literature events and conferences. So far, Suman Muthe has participated and presented in more than 13 national and international conferences

Books
Suman Muthe has authored books on sociology, tribals and women which are titled as follows (originally written in Marathi):
 
 The world of Tribal Women (in India)
 Contribution of Christian Marathi Literature in Society
 Sociological Concepts- An Introduction
 Life of Indian women in a changing sociological landscape
 Literature-Society engagement- compilation of short essays
 Women in co-operative sector
 Travel memoirs
 Andhardive (collection of short poems)

https://en.wikipedia.org/wiki/File:Book-_Sahitya_Samaj_Anubandh_(_in_Marathi).pdf

Testimonials

"Sumantai Muthe is an eminent personality. I was introduced to Sumantai at a women's literary convention and her work is notable" Smt. Ranjanatai Shelar

Awards

Social workers
Social workers from Maharashtra
Women educators from Maharashtra
Educators from Maharashtra